Death Game is a 1996 American film which was part of the Roger Corman Presents series.

It was also known as Mortal Challenge.

Plot
In the near future, teenagers are kidnapped and forced to fight cyborgs for the entertainment of the wealthy.

Cast
Timothy Bottoms as Jack
David McCallum as Malius
Evan Lurie as Grepp
Alfonso Quijada as Freeze
Vince Murdocco as Alex
Nicholas Hill as Hawk
Jody Thompson
Kristina Copeland as Sheena
Darren Choo as Kado
Kim Calderone as Becca
Douglas Smith as Tristan

References

External links

Death Game at TCMDB

1996 films
Films produced by Roger Corman
American science fiction television films
1990s English-language films
1990s American films
1996 action films